Ruri is a Japanese feminine given name.

Possible writings
Ruri can be written using different kanji characters and can mean:
 truly
genuine 
瑠璃, "lapis lazuli"
琉璃, "lapis lazuli"
as a given name
瑠璃, "lapis lazuli"
流理, "current/flow, logic"
留莉, "detain, jasmine"
瑠里, "lapis lazuli, home

People
Ruri Mizutani (光里), a member of the Japanese music group Bon-Bon Blanco

Fictional characters
Ruri (Dr. Stone), a character in the manga series Dr. Stone
Hojo no Ruri (ルリ), a character in the manga series Onmyō Taisenki
Ruri, a character in the PS2 video game Eureka Seven vol. 2: New Vision
Ruri (瑠璃), the main character in the Japanese PS2 video game Ururun Quest: Koiyuuki
Ruri Gokō (瑠璃), a character in the manga and anime series Oreimo
Ruri Himeyuri (瑠璃), a character in the anime series To Heart 2
Ruri Hoshino (ルリ), a character in the anime series Martian Successor Nadesico
Ruri Mihashi (瑠里), a character in the baseball manga series Big Windup!
Ruri Saiki (翠雀), a character in the manga and anime series Angel Sanctuary
Ruri Saionji (瑠璃), a character in the manga series Hot Gimmick
Ruri Sarasa (ルリ), the main protagonist of the manga series Tokyo Underground
Ruri Kurosaki/Lulu Obsidian (瑠璃), a character in the anime series Yu-Gi-Oh! Arc-V
Ruri Hibirgaoka (雲雀丘 瑠璃), a main character in the anime series Anne Happy
Ruri Miyamoto (宮本 るり, Miyamoto Ruri), a character in the manga and anime series Nisekoi
Ruri (琉璃), a movie-only character exclusive to Inuyasha the Movie: Affections Touching Across Time

See also
Ruri no Ame, a song by Alice Nine
Ruri no Shima, a Japanese TV drama also known as Ruri's Island
Yoake Mae yori Ruriiro na, a Japanese adult visual novel video game

Japanese feminine given names